The MPL-Philippines Season 8 was the eight iteration of the Mobile Legends: Bang Bang Professional League (MPL) of the Philippines. The season ran from August 27, 2021, and ended on the conclusion of the Grand Finals on October 24, 2021. Season 8 was the fourth online tournament in MPL Philippines primarily due to the COVID-19 pandemic.

The season was known for its shift to the franchise-based setup system and that numerous franchises would be added on by the league. The season concluded with Blacklist International winning the season's championship defeating ONIC Philippines in the best-of-7 grand final series, 4 games to 1, to win back-to-back MPL championships and becoming the second team to do this in league history. The first to do it was the Sunsparks, winning both titles for Seasons 4 and 5.

Background 
This season would be the fourth tournament held almost online, except for the Grand Finals which was held offline with no live audience at the World Trade Center, Pasay City. The season saw a dramatic decrease in viewership, obtaining 26.5 million hours watched compared to Season 7's 33 million. This was primarily due to the lost and abandoning of other languages' streams such as the English and Indonesian streams. Furthermore, its peak viewers would rank 3rd all-time with 593,399 peak viewers compared to Season 7's 1.4 million peak viewers and Season 6's 765.9 thousand viewers.

The season also served as the Philippine qualifiers for the Mobile Legends: Bang Bang World Championship or known as M3.

Regular season

Format 
The regular season began on August 27, 2021, and ended on October 10, 2021. The regular season was a double round-robin format, with each team plays their opponents twice, for a total of 14 games being played per team. A total of three group stage points may be earned in a single regular season match, based on the following:
 If the match is decided by a 2–0 score, the winner shall earn 3 group stage points, while the loser earns 0 group stage points.
 If the match is decided by a 2–1 score, the winner shall earn 2 group stage points, while the loser earns 1 group stage point.
The top two teams of the standings gained outright qualification to the Upper Bracket Semifinals, while the next four teams qualified for the play-ins.

Standings

Playoffs

Format 
The top 6 teams at the end of regular season qualified for the playoffs. All of the playoff teams after the season were invited for the 2021 ONE Esports Invitationals, with the champion gaining outright quarterfinal slot. 

The playoffs will follow a two-elimination series at the beginning and would follow a double-elimination tournament where the upper-bracket losers will descend to the lower-bracket. Playoff games would be a best-of-five tournament and the grand finals would be a best-of-seven matchup.

Venues 
The six matches of the playoffs were cast at the MPL Arena Games and were held online. The final two matches, the lower bracket final and the Grand Finals, took place at World Trade Center, Pasay City and were held with no live audience.

Bracket

Play-ins 
Play-ins are a best-of-5 series, the winners advanced to the Upper Bracket Semifinals, the losers were eliminated.

|}

Upper Bracket Semifinals 
Winners advanced to the Upper Bracket Final, losers were relegated to the Lower Bracket Semifinals.

|}

Lower Bracket Semifinals 
An eliminator match. Winner advanced to the Lower Bracket Final.

|}

Upper Bracket Finals 
Winner advanced to the Grand Final and qualified for M3 World Championships, while loser was relegated to the Lower Bracket Final.

|}

Lower Bracket Finals 
An eliminator match. Winner advanced to the Grand Finals, and qualified for the M3 World Championships.
Venue: World Trade Center, Pasay City

|}

Grand Finals 
Grand Finals were a best-of-seven series, both finalists represented the Philippines for the M3 World Championships. 
Venue: World Trade Center, Pasay City

|}

Awards

Individual awards

Team of the Season 

Source:

References 

Mobile Legends: Bang Bang competitions
Esports competitions in the Philippines
2021 in Philippine sport